Master Tara Singh (24 June 1885 – 22 November 1967) was an Indian Sikh political and religious figure in the first half of the 20th century. He was instrumental in organising the Shiromani Gurdwara Prabhandak Committee and guiding the Sikhs during the partition of India, which he strongly opposed. He later led their demand for a Sikh-majority state in East Punjab. His daughter, the Indian journalist and politician Rajinder Kaur, was killed by Khalistani militants in Bathinda. In 2018, his great granddaughter in law mentioned that Master Tara Singh’s “dream of an autonomous Sikh state in India remains unfulfilled.”

Early life 
Singh was born on 24 June 1885 to a Sikh Khatri family in Rawalpindi, Punjab Province in British India. Later he became a high school teacher upon his graduation from Khalsa College, Amritsar, in 1907. Singh's career in education was within the Sikh school system and the use of "Master" as a prefix to his name reflects this period.

Political career 
Singh was ardent in his desire to promote and protect the cause of Sikhism. This often put him at odds with civil authorities and he was jailed on 14 occasions for civil disobedience between 1930 and 1966. Early examples of his support for civil disobedience came through his close involvement with the movement led by Mahatma Gandhi. He became a leader of the Shiromani Akali Dal (SAD) political party, which was the major force in Sikh politics, and he was similarly involved with the Shiromani Gurdwara Parbandhak Committee (Supreme Committee of Gurdwara Management), an apex body that dealt with the Sikh places of worship known as gurdwaras.

Partition of India 

As with other Sikh organisations, Singh and his Shiromani Akali Dal (SAD) condemned the Lahore Resolution and the movement to create Pakistan, viewing it as welcoming possible persecution; he thus strongly opposed the partition of India, saying that him and his party would fight "tooth and nail" against the concept of a Pakistan.

Independent India 
Singh's most significant cause was the creation of a distinct Punjabi-speaking state. He believed that this would best protect the integrity of Sikh religious and political traditions. He began a hunger strike in 1961 at the Golden Temple in Amritsar, promising to continue it to his death unless the then Prime Minister of India, Jawaharlal Nehru agreed to his demand for such a state. Nehru argued that India was a secular country and the creation of a state based on religious distinction was inappropriate. Nonetheless, Nehru did promise to consider the issue. Singh abandoned his fast after 48 days. Singh's fellow Sikhs turned against him, believing that he had capitulated, and they put him on trial in a court adjudged by pijaras. Singh pleaded guilty to the charges laid against him and found his reputation in tatters. The community felt he had abandoned his ideals and replaced him in the SAD.

The linguistic division of the Indian state of Punjab eventually took place in 1966, with the Hindi-speaking areas redesignated as a part of the state of Haryana. Singh himself died in Chandigarh on 22 November 1967.

References

Further reading 
Gateway to Sikhism: Famous Sikhs:Master Tara Singh
Heritage of the Sikhs, by Sardar Harbans Singh
The Sikh Times - Biographies - Master Tara Singh: India Finally Pays Tribute
Bhai Maharaj Singh Ji
The Punjab Heritage THE STRUGGLE FOR KHALISTAN
Harjinder Singh Dilgeer, SIKH TWAREEKH (Sikh History in Punjabi in 5 volumes), Sikh University Press, Belgium, 2007.
Harjinder Singh Dilgeer, SIKH HISTORY (in English in 10 volumes), Sikh University Press, Belgium, 2010–11.
Harjinder Singh Dilgeer, Master Tara Singh's Contribution to Punjabi Literature (thesis, granted Ph.D. by the Panjab University in 1982).
Durlab Singh, Valiant Fighter. 1945.
Manohar Singh Batra, Master Tara Singh, Delhi, 1972.
Jaswant Singh, Jeewan Master Tara Singh, Amritsar, 1972.
Master Tara Singh, Meri Yaad, Amritsar, 1945

External links
Master Tara Singh materials in the South Asian American Digital Archive (SAADA)

1885 births
1967 deaths
Politicians from Rawalpindi
Sikh politics
Indian Sikhs
Punjabi people
Chandigarh politicians
Indian former Hindus
Converts to Sikhism from Hinduism
Shiromani Akali Dal politicians
Indian independence activists from Punjab (British India)
Prisoners and detainees of British India
19th-century Indian people
19th-century Hindus
20th-century Indian politicians